The 1909 Nobel Prize in Literature was awarded to the Swedish author Selma Lagerlöf (1858–1940) "in appreciation of the lofty idealism, vivid imagination and spiritual perception that characterize her writings." She became the first woman and first Swede to be awarded the prize.

In his award ceremony speech on 10 December 1909, Claes Annerstedt of the Swedish Academy said:

Laureate

Selma Lagerlöf's authorship is deeply rooted in folk tales, legends, and stories from her home district in Värmland County, Sweden. Her début novel, Gösta Berling's Saga (1891), broke away from the then-prevailing realism and naturalism and is characterized by a vivid imagination. Even so, her works provide realistic depictions of people's circumstances, ideas, and social lives during the 19th-century religious revival. Lagerlöf wrote in prose and her stories characterized by a captivating descriptive power and their language by purity and clarity. Among her significant novels include Jerusalem (1901–02), Nils Holgerssons underbara resa genom Sverige ("The Wonderful Adventures of Nil", 1907), Körkarlen ("Thy Soul Shall Bear Witness!", 1912), and The Ring of the Löwenskölds (1925–28).

Deliberations

Nominations
Selma Lagerlöf received 28 nominations since 1904. Her highest number of nominations (11 nominations) were for the 1909 prize with which she was awarded eventually. In total, the Nobel committee received 38 nominations including Angelo de Gubernatis, Maurice Maeterlinck (awarded in 1911), Iwan Gilkin, and Jaroslav Vrchlický. Seven of the nominees were nominated for the first time including Ernest Lavisse, Verner von Heidenstam (awarded in 1916), Martin Greif, and Émile Verhaeren.

The authors Gustaf af Geijerstam, Innokenty Annensky, Jakub Bart-Ćišinski, Rosa Nouchette Carey, Euclides da Cunha, John Davidson, Amalia Domingo Soler, George Manville Fenn, Clyde Fitch, Jacob Gordin, Sarah Orne Jewett, Cesare Lombroso, Luis Alfredo Martínez, Clorinda Matto de Turner, Catulle Mendès, Alfredo Oriani, Signe Rink, John Millington Synge, Renée Vivien, Rudolf von Gottschall, Detlev von Liliencron, Ernst von Wildenbruch, and Egerton Ryerson Young died in 1909 without having been nominated for the prize.

Reactions
The choice of Swedish writer Selma Lagerlöf as Nobel laureate in 1909 (for the "lofty idealism, vivid imagination and spiritual perception that characterizes her writings") followed fierce debate because of her writing style and subject matter, which broke literary decorums of the time.

Award ceremony
During Lagerlöf's acceptance speech, she remained humble and told a fantastic story of her father, as she 'visited him in heaven'. In the story, she asks her father for help with the debt she owes and her father explains the debt is from all the people who supported her throughout her career. Lagerlöf explains that she remembered her father the moment she received the prize, saying: 

In 1914, she also became a member of the Swedish Academy. For both the academy membership and her Nobel literature prize, she was the first woman to be so honored. She became a nominator for Georg Brandes for the 1920 and 1922 Nobel prize.

Notes

References

External links
Award ceremony speech by Claes Annerstedt nobelprize.org
Nobel diploma nobelprize.org
Photo gallery nobelprize.org

1909
Selma Lagerlöf